The Hispano–Portuguese Summits or simply Iberian Summits (Spanish: cumbres ibéricas; Portuguese: cimeiras ibéricas) are formal meetings conducted by the Government of Portugal and the Government of Spain to discuss issues of mutual concern. The first one was celebrated in November 1983 in Sintra, Portugal. They are chaired by the respective heads of government. In the 2001 summit, both parts agreed to celebrate additional meetings between the foreign ministers in-between-summits in order to prepare the next Iberian summit in line. Since 2004 presidents of Spanish border regions (Castile and León, Galicia, Extremadura and Andalusia) may also attend to the summits. 

A list of the several Iberian summits celebrated is presented as follows:

References 
Citations

Bibliography
 
 

Portugal–Spain relations